Jason John Blunt (born 16 August 1977) is an English football coach and former professional footballer who played in midfield.

He currently works for I2I International Soccer Academy  after leaving his role as the Leeds United academy as the under-23s manager in the summer of 2017, after a spell as development squad manager as well as under-18s manager.

Blunt left his role at Mousehole AFC in March 2018 to join I2I International Soccer Academy as Lead Coach.

Playing career
He began his playing career with Leeds United, making a handful of first-team appearances in the Premier League for the club, making his first team debut under Howard Wilkinson, however, Blunt found places hard to come by with likes of Lee Bowyer, Carlton Palmer, Alfie Haaland, Bruno Ribeiro, Matt Jones and Stephen McPhail all vying for places in Leeds' central midfield, before moving into the Football League and non-League football.

Coaching career
Blunt, who managed Sutton Town for six months in 2007, now coaches sports and physical education at Wakefield Independent School while coaching at Leeds United Academy.

After coaching Leeds' under-12 team, after Richard Naylor left the club in the summer of 2014, Blunt became the new coach of Leeds' under-18s and the development squad manager. For the final five games of the 2014/15 season, Blunt assisted the then Leeds head coach Neil Redfearn in the first team after the suspension of Redfearn's assistant Steve Thompson.

On 5 August 2015, Leeds United appointed Daral Pugh as the head of academy coaching, effectively replacing Redfearn and Blunt (who had previously been filling in for Redfearn during his spell as head coach of the first team), and John Anderson became under-18s manager. Blunt was named as a coach to work alongside Anderson.

On 24 June 2016, Blunt was promoted to under-23's/development squad manager.

On 7 June 2017, Blunt left his position at Leeds to join Mousehole AFC.

In March 2018 Blunt left his role at Mousehole AFC to join I2I International Soccer Academy as Lead Coach.

International career
During his playing career he represented England U18's in games again France and Scotland.

Personal life
His son, Connor Leak-Blunt, is also a footballer, and after progressing through the academies of Leeds United and Sheffield United, entered non-league football.

References

External links
Blunt's profile at Soccerbase

1977 births
Living people
Footballers from Cornwall
Sportspeople from Penzance
English footballers
Leeds United F.C. players
Raith Rovers F.C. players
Blackpool F.C. players
Scarborough F.C. players
Yeovil Town F.C. players
Doncaster Rovers F.C. players
Tamworth F.C. players
Halifax Town A.F.C. players
Sutton Town A.F.C. players
Goole A.F.C. players
Premier League players
English Football League players
Scottish Football League players
Leeds United F.C. non-playing staff
Association football midfielders
Association football coaches